Kathy Vargas (born June 23, 1950) is an American artist who creates collages and photographs. She often devotes several works to a particular theme and creates her art in series.

Biography 
Vargas was born in San Antonio, Texas. She was influenced early on by her Catholic faith, her grandmother's ghost stories and her father's retelling of pre-Columbian history.

Vargas has a BFA from the University of Texas at San Antonio in 1981 and in 1984 received her MFA.

Kathy Vargas currently teaches in the art department at The University of the Incarnate Word in San Antonio, TX. She has lectured throughout the United States and Mexico.

Art 
Kathy Vargas became interested in the hand-coloured photography around 1970 when she worked for Bill and Jerry Hayes in her hometown at a small production company. She was placed in the animation department and from there learned how to do special effects. Vargas learned dark room work here before she began learning about photography.

At the Southwest Craft Center, Kathy learned rock-and-roll photography from Tom Wright in 1971, which she practiced professionally from 1973 to 1977.

Kathy Vargas began classes with Mel Casas, a Chicano artist, who asked her to attend a Con Safo art group meeting after seeing some of her photographs. She felt welcome here and loved what the group was doing with art. Kathy gives credit to Casas for opening her eyes and sharing many Chicano and Chicana artists with her. When she began to feel limited, she notified them that it was time for her to create her own art and departed from the Con Safo art group. Vargas wanted to experiment with the medium and create her own photographic style.

A few years later, while working on a documentary project about yard shrines in her home town of San Antonio, Texas, she began researching Mexican and pre-Columbian myths and literature, and to produce works based on a photographic 'magic realism' involving layering by multiple exposure and hand colouring (Marshall).

In 1993 she produced a portfolio titled, Revelaciones, and a year later was published in Nueva Luz photographic journal, volume 4#2 (En Foco, Bronx: 1994)

She is interested in "the anatomy of death and the aftermath of everlasting life." Vargas often uses iconography from Aztec art, along with various other cultural and Christian symbols.

Further reading 
"Photography and Nostalgia: The Touched-up Images of Kathy Vargas".[pp. 29–41] in David William Foster, Picturing the Barrio: Ten Chicano Photographers.

Exhibits 
Solo exhibits:
 Sala Uno in Rome
 Galeria San Martín in Mexico City
 Centro Recoleta in Buenos Aires, Argentina
 McNay Art Museum in San Antonio, Texas
Group exhibits:
 “Hospice: A Photographic Inquiry,” a traveling exhibit commissioned by the Corcoran Gallery, Washington D.C.
 “Chicano Art: Resistance and Affirmation (CARA)”
"Visibilities: Intrepid Women of Artpace" at Artpace, San Antonio, TX.

Books
 Vargas, Kathy, and Connie Arismendi. Intimate lives: work by ten contemporary Latina artists. Austin, TX: Women & Their Work, 1993.
 Muñoz, Celia Alvarez, Noriega, Chon A., José Piedra, Kathy Vargas, and Victor Zamudio-Taylor. Revelaciones = Revelations: Hispanic art of evanescence. Ithaca, NY: Hispanic American Studies Program, Cornell University, 1993.
 Goldberg, Jim, Nan Goldin, Sally Mann, Jack Radcliffe, and Kathy Vargas. Hospice: a photographic inquiry. Boston: Little, Brown, in association with the Corcoran Gallery of Art and National Hospice Foundation, 1996. .
 Lippard, Lucy R., and MaLin Wilson-Powell. Kathy Vargas: photographs, 1971–2000. San Antonio, TX: Marion Koogler McNay Art Museum, 2000.  .
 Art at Our Doorstep: San Antonio Writers and Artists featuring Kathy Vargas. Edited by Nan Cuba and Riley Robinson (Trinity University Press, 2008).

References

 Anglo-American Name Authority File, s.v. "Vargas, Kathy", LC Control Number no 9502087, cited September 10, 2006.
 Marshall, Peter. 'Any Colour You Like', About, Inc., cited September 10, 2005.
 Kathy Vargas on En Foco

1950 births
University of the Incarnate Word faculty
American photographers
Living people
Hispanic and Latino American women in the arts
20th-century American women photographers
20th-century American photographers
American women academics
21st-century American women